Robert J. Callahan (June 3, 1930 January 1, 2013) was a justice of the Connecticut Supreme Court from 1985 to 2000. He had also served as Chief Justice from 1996 to 1999. He was born in Norwalk, Connecticut. He had served on the court since 1985. He was a graduate of Boston College and Fordham University School of Law.

References

Personal life 
Robert's son, Patrick Callahan, was sworn-in at the Connecticut State Capitol on Wednesday, January 6, 2021. Patrick serves as the State Representative for the 108th district: Danbury, New Fairfield, Sherman, and New Milford.

External links
Robert J. Callahan memorials at the Connecticut State Library

1930 births
2013 deaths
Boston College alumni
Fordham University School of Law alumni
Chief Justices of the Connecticut Supreme Court
Politicians from Norwalk, Connecticut
Deaths from Parkinson's disease
20th-century American judges